Stet Howland (born August 14, 1960) is an American drummer.

Early life
Howland graduated in 1978 from Duxbury High School. He started playing drums at age seven and has been teaching and playing for a living since age 13. His influences are Buddy Rich, Gene Krupa, Animal from The Muppets, Sam Kinison, and Hulk Hogan.

Career
Howland played for Temple of Brutality (2004–2006), RUN21 (1987–1988), Killing Machine (2003–2005), JOETOWN (2000-2002) Belladonna (1997–1999), The Howlin' Dogs, Impellitteri (1988–1990), WASP (1991–2005), and Carnival of Souls (2003–2005). In February 2006, he announced his departure from W.A.S.P. to concentrate on his own projects. Howland also was a drummer in Blackfoot. He was the drummer for Lita Ford and performed with her at Rocklahoma 2008, and can be found on Lita Ford's album Wicked Wonderland. Drums for the album were recorded at Howland's personal studio in southwest Florida. In 2010 Howland recorded drum tracks at his studio for a cover of "Thunder Thighs" on Whole Lotta Love: An All-Star Salute to Fat Chicks.

In 2010, Howland founded the reality-based rock 'n' roll television series Stet TV.

Howland is currently playing with a band titled Where Angels Suffer, with Chris Holmes (guitar; ex-W.A.S.P.), Ira Black (guitar; ex-Lizzy Borden), Steve Unger (bass; ex-Metal Church), and Rich Lewis (vocals; Randy Piper's Animal). On July 2, 2011, Howland joined 10,000 Views, a Fort Myers, Florida based powerhouse rock band. Other current members of 10,000 Views are Timmy Johnson (lead vocals/rhythm guitar) and John Hyatt (lead guitar/vocals).

In April 2017, it was announced that Howland had joined heavy metal band Metal Church after the departure of previous drummer Jeff Plate.

Discography
With W.A.S.P.:
The Crimson Idol (June 8, 1992)
Still Not Black Enough (June 1995)
Kill.Fuck.Die (April 29, 1997)
Double Live Assassins (February 24, 1998)
Helldorado (May 18, 1999)
The Sting (2000)
Unholy Terror (April 3, 2001)
The Neon God: Part 1 - The Rise (April 6, 2004)
The Neon God: Part 2 - The Demise (September 28, 2004)
The Best of the Best 2CD (2007)

With Run 21:
 Flat Blank Parts (1987)

With Stream:
 Take It or Leave It (1995)
 Chasing the Dragon (2002)

With Belladonna:
 Spells of Fear (1996)

With Mike Vescera Project:
 Altar (2000–2004)

With JOETOWN:
 Feelin' Rock'n'Roll (2000)

With Carnival Of Souls:
 Ashes to Ashes (2004)

With Superseed:
 Superseed (2004)

With Killing Machine:
 Killing Machine (2004)

With Temple of Brutality:
 Lethal Agenda (2005)

With Lita Ford:
 Wicked Wonderland (2009)

With Metal Church:

 Damned If You Do (2018)
With Last Temptation:

 Last Temptation (2019)

Projects
Howland has toured with and or recorded with: 
 Vengeance
 Snapdragon
 Rockestra
 Run21
 Impellitteri
 Kuni
 Big Richard
 Belladonna
 Uriah Heep
 MVP (Michael Vescera Project)
 3HB
 JOETOWN (Joe Delaney)
 WASP
 Stream
 Superseed
 Blackfoot
 Lynyrd Skynyrd
 Killing Machine
 The Howlin Dogs
 The Lucky Dogs
 The Biscuit Band
 Temple of Brutality
 The New Kings
 Lita Ford
 Stet TV Band
 W.A.S.
 10,000 Views
 Four By Fate

References

External links
StetHowland.com 
The New Kings Website 
Stet Howland Metal Sludge interview during the 2005 American Metal Blast Tour by C.C. Banana
Stet TV Official Website

W.A.S.P. members
American rock drummers
Living people
1960 births
Metal Church members
Blackfoot (band) members
Impellitteri members
20th-century American drummers
American male drummers
20th-century American male musicians
Duxbury High School alumni